The Mang are an ethnic group living primarily in Lai Châu, northwestern Vietnam, where they are one of that nation's 54 officially recognized ethnic groups. There are also about 500 Mang living in the Yunnan province of southern China, where they are officially termed an undistinguished nationality.

The Mang language is part of the Pakanic branch of the Austroasiatic language family.

See also
Bolyu language
Bugan language
Pakanic languages
List of ethnic groups in Vietnam

References

Further reading

External links
Mang language page from Ethnologue site
RWAAI (Repository and Workspace for Austroasiatic Intangible Heritage)
http://hdl.handle.net/10050/00-0000-0000-0003-93F7-D@view Mang in RWAAI Digital Archive

Ethnic groups in Vietnam
Ethnic groups in China